Events from the year 2007 in the United Arab Emirates.

Incumbents
President: Khalifa bin Zayed Al Nahyan 
Prime Minister: Mohammed bin Rashid Al Maktoum

Events of uae

May
 May 13 - President of Iran Mahmoud Ahmadinejad visits the United Arab Emirates for the first official visit since 1979.

August
 August 27 - A fire breaks out at the Jebel Ali port triggering explosions at a chemical storage depot.

September
 September 12 - Burj Dubai reaches 555.3 metres, surpassing the 553.3 metre CN Tower in Toronto, Ontario Canada as the world's tallest free-standing structure on land, which it had been since 1976. The building is due for completion 2008 with a final projected height of 818 metres.

November
 November 1 - Benazir Bhutto leaves Karachi for United Arab Emirates amidst speculations that Pakistani President Pervez Musharraf might impose martial law in Pakistan.
 November 8 - At least seven construction workers are killed and 15 others injured when a bridge under construction collapses in Dubai.
 November 12 - Airbus and Boeing both win a giant order of 100 planes from Dubai Aerospace Enterprise, an Emirati jet leasing corporation.

 
Years of the 21st century in the United Arab Emirates
United Arab Emirates
United Arab Emirates
2010s in the United Arab Emirates